was a seventeenth-century (Edo period) Japanese poet and samurai  who studied under Matsuo Bashō.

Masahide practiced medicine in Zeze and led a group of poets who built the Mumyō Hut.

Examples
Barn's burnt down
My barn having burned to the ground
I can see the moon. 

Alternate translation:

 
Since my house burned down
I now own a better view
of the rising moon

When bird passes on
When bird passes on --
like moon,
a friend to water.

Masahide's Death Poem
while I walk on
the moon keeps pace beside me:
friend in the water

References

Samurai
1657 births
1723 deaths
Japanese writers of the Edo period
17th-century Japanese poets